The Garden is an album by the American band Silver Apples. The duo began recording it in 1969, but it remained unfinished until 1998. It was released that year on Whirlybird Records.

Reception 

Brad Reno of Trouser Press called the album "nowhere near as strong as the first two", but "still welcome".

Track listing 
All music composed by Silver Apples with lyrics composed by Simeon, except where indicated.

 "I Don't Care What the People Say" – 3:08
 "Tabouli Noodle" – 4:18
 "Walkin" – 4:07
 "Cannonball Noodle" – 5:29
 "John Hardy" (Traditional) – 2:22
 "Cockroach Noodle" – 2:24
 "The Owl" – 3:23
 "Swamp Noodle" – 2:58
 "Mustang Sally" (Mack Rice) – 3:15
 "Anasazi Noodle" – 3:20
 "Again" (Traditional) – 2:58
 "Starlight Noodle" – 4:39
 "Mad Man Blues" – 3:13
 "Fire Ant Noodle" – 3:43

 Bully Records CD bonus tracks (2006)

References 

1998 albums
Silver Apples albums